Alana Porter (born 7 February 2001) is an Australian rules footballer who plays for Collingwood in the AFL Women's (AFLW).

Early life and state football
Porter played for Oakleigh Chargers in the Girls' NAB League. She has also been with Collingwood's VFLW squad, playing 7 games for them in the 2019 season. She made history with the VFLW Collingwood squad, helping them win their first premiership. In her junior years she played  with St Peters Football Club in the South Metro Junior Football League (SMJFL), where she was in the top three of the best and fairest for two seasons. Later, she transitioned from midfield to defence ahead of her AFLW career.

AFL Women's career
Porter was selected by Collingwood for their AFLW squad with pick 82. On the morning of the draft, she was studying for her VCE exams and was very excited to be drafted by Collingwood as she was a fan of the club. She made her debut in round 1, 2020, in a match at Victoria Park against West Coast. After playing in each match of her debut season, Porter became known as a fierce competitor and is regarded to handle leaps to a new level in an unfazed manner. In  her debut season, she won the Best First Year Player award, together with Aishling Sheridan.

Personal life
Porter studied at Bentleigh Secondary College, where she was Sport Captain and competed in the State Athletics helping Bentleigh reach 7th in the state. She is planning to study science and Japanese at the University of Melbourne.

Statistics
Statistics are correct to the end of the S7 (2022) season.

|- 
! scope="row" style="text-align:center" | 2020
|style="text-align:center;"|
| 9 || 7 || 0 || 0 || 21 || 15 || 36 || 6 || 12 || 0.0 || 0.0 || 3.0 || 2.1 || 5.1 || 0.9 || 1.7
|- 
! scope="row" style="text-align:center" | 2021
|style="text-align:center;"|
| 9 || 11 || 0 || 1 || 31 || 36 || 67 || 12 || 16 || 0.0 || 0.1 || 2.8 || 3.3 || 6.1 || 1.1 || 1.5
|- 
! scope="row" style="text-align:center" | 2022
|style="text-align:center;"|
| 9 || 10 || 0 || 1 || 35 || 44 || 79 || 13 || 30 || 0.0 || 0.1 || 3.5 || 4.4 || 7.9 || 1.3 || 3.0
|- 
! scope="row" style="text-align:center" | S7 (2022)
|style="text-align:center;"|
| 9 || 9 || 1 || 0 || 30 || 22 || 52 || 10 || 19 || 0.1 || 0.0 || 3.3 || 2.4 || 5.8 || 1.1 || 2.1
|- class="sortbottom"
! colspan=3| Career
! 37
! 1
! 2
! 117
! 117
! 234
! 41
! 77
! 0.03
! 0.1
! 3.2
! 3.2
! 6.3
! 1.1
! 2.1
|}

References

External links

 

Living people
2001 births
Oakleigh Chargers players (NAB League Girls)
Collingwood Football Club (AFLW) players
Australian rules footballers from Melbourne
Sportswomen from Victoria (Australia)